Chushi Gangdruk was a  Tibetan guerrilla group. Formally organized on 16 June 1958, the Chushi Gangdruk guerrilla fighters fought the forces of the People's Republic of China (PRC) in Tibet from 1956 to 1974.

The Dokham Chushi Gangdruk organization, a charity set up in New York City and India with chapters in other countries, now supports survivors of the Chushi Gangdruk resistance currently living in India. Chushi Gangdruk also led the 14th Dalai Lama out of Lhasa, where he had lived, soon after the start of the Chinese invasion. During that time, a group of Chushi Gangdruk guerillas was led by Kunga Samten, who is now deceased. Because the United States was prepared to recognize the People's Republic of China in the early 1970s, the CIA Tibetan Program, which funded the Chushi Gangdruk army, was ended in 1974.

Name 
 Chushi Gangdruk ("Four Rivers, Six Ranges") is the name traditionally given to the eastern Tibetan region of Kham where the gorges of the Gyalmo Nyulchu (Salween), Dzachu (Mekong), Drichu (Yangtse), and Machu (Huang Ho) rivers, all arising on the Tibetan Plateau, pass between six parallel ranges of mountains (Duldza Zalmogang, Tshawagang, Markhamgang, Pobargang, Mardzagang, and Minyagang) that form the watersheds for these rivers. "Chu" (choo) is the Tibetan word for "water", and "shi" (she) is the Tibetan word for 4. "Gang" is range, and "druk" (drewk) means 6.

The group's full name was the "Kham Four Rivers, Six Ranges Tibetan Defenders of the Faith Volunteer Army".

History

Fall of Chamdo and signing of the Seventeen-Point Agreement 
On 19 October 1950, the monastery where Ngabo Shapé was hiding was surrounded by the Chinese troops accompanied by a few Khampa guides, and here Ngabo Shapé and his officials and troops surrendered to the invading Chinese. The Tibetan Government army in Chamdo was defeated, and the Communist Chinese army took over the city of Chamdo. In Drugu monastery, Ngabo Shapé signed the official surrender.

During the negotiation of the Seventeen-Point Agreement, when the negotiation broke down after Ngabo Shapé resisted to sign the agreement, Li Weihan threatened to order the Chinese troops to march into Lhasa. They decided it was more perilous to Tibet not to reach an agreement, so they accepted the Chinese terms without asking Lhasa. The Chinese were further furious when they were told that the Dalai Lama’s seal was still in Yatung with him. The Chinese made new seal for Ngabo Shapé to stamp the document when he exclaimed that he did not have his official seal to stamp the document, though he had with him the official seal as the Governor General of Kham. Therefore, on 23 May 1951, Ngabo Shapé was forced to sign under duress the "Agreement of the Central People’s Government and the Local Government of Tibet on Measures for the Peaceful Liberation of Tibet," commonly known as the “Seventeen-Point Agreement”.

Formation of Chushi Gangdrug 
Andrug Gompo Tashi (also known as Andrug Jindak) established a people's army called Chushi Gangdrug. Like many other volunteered fighters, Andrug Jindak financed many of the freedom fighters and was accepted as their undisputed leader of the resistance army.

In order to mobilize more support across the different regions of Tibet, the names Tenshung Danglang Mak were appended to Chushi Gangdrug in order to address the pan-Tibetan composition of the people's army. It was not a Tibetan government army but rather a grassroots army of the Tibetan people. Tenshung Danglang Mak fought for the political and religious freedom of Tibet. Khampas and Amdowas had been fighting against the invading Chinese Communist troops since 1956 in different parts of Kham and Amdo. On 16 June 1958, a meeting of Chushi Gangdrug and their supporters was held in Lhodak Dhama Dzong with impressive cavalry parade, incense burnt to the Dalai Lama photograph, and then launched the Chushi Gangdrug yellow flag of the Tensik Danglang Mak with an emblem of two swords represented a deity and handles symbolic of Dorjee or thunderbolt and lotus flower.

The formation of the Chushi Gangdruk was announced on 16 June 1958. It was called National Volunteer Defence Army (NVDA). "Chushi Gangdruk" is a Tibetan phrase meaning "land of four rivers and six ranges," and refers to Amdo and Kham. The group included Tibetans from those regions of eastern Tibet, and its main objective was to drive PRC occupational forces out of Tibet. While central and western Tibet (Ü-Tsang) were bound by a 17-point agreement with the People's Republic of China, the PRC initiated land reform in eastern Tibet (including Amdo and Kham) and engaged in harsh reprisals against the Tibetan land-owners there.

Under the direction of General Andrug Gonpo Tashi, Chushi Gangdruk included 37 allied forces and 18 military commanders. They drafted a 27-point military law governing the conduct of the volunteers. Their headquarters were located at Tsona, then later moved to Lhagyari.

Initially militia members purchased their own weapons, mainly World War II-era British .303 in, German 7.92 mm, and Russian 7.62 mm caliber rifles. Chushi Gangdruk contacted the US government for support. However, the State Department required an official request from the Tibetan government in Lhasa, which was not forthcoming. State Department requests were made and ignored in both 1957 and 1958.

CIA support 
Without getting approval from the Dalai Lama, the US Central Intelligence Agency decided to go ahead to support the Chushi Gangdrug Tenshung Danglang Mak in the summer of 1959. The CIA provided the group with material assistance and aid, including arms and ammunition, as well as training to members of Chushi Gangdruk and other Tibetan guerrilla groups at Camp Hale.

The Tibetan involvement with the U.S. came during a period of Cold War rhetorical anti-imperialism among major world powers, used to justify contemporary imperial expansion. Rhetorically, this new push for empire-building was manifested in the United States as anti-communism, and in the People's Republic of China as anti-capitalism.

Allen Dulles, the CIA deputy director responsible for overseeing all CIA covert operations, saw an opportunity to destabilize People's Republic of China. The primary motive was more to impede and harass the Chinese Communists, than to render sufficient aid to the Tibetans.

Surrender to Indian government 
Chushi Gangdrug assisted the escape of the 14th Dalai Lama to India in March 1959. After this, the idea of any further battle with the Chinese Communist troops was abandoned. Andrug Jindak persuaded Kunga Samten Dewatshang in Tawang to surrender his weapons to the Indian authorities. Shangri Lhagyal and other Chushi Gangdrug fighters handed over their weapons to the Indian officials at Tezpur, India. They crossed the border where they were greeted by a representative of the Tibetan Government, Tsedrung Jampa Wangdu. On 29 April 1959, they handed over their rifles, ammunition, and all other weapons to the Deputy Commissioner of Tezpur district, and were permitted to take their gold, silver, and other valuables.

The 14th Dalai Lama conferred the rank of Dsasak to Andrug Gompo Tashi in a letter: “You have led the Chushi Gangdrug force with unshakeable determination to resist the Chinese occupation army for the great national cause of defending the freedom of Tibet. I confer on you the rank of Dzasak (the highest military rank equivalent to general) in recognition of your services to the country. The present situation calls for a continuance of your brave struggle with the same determination and courage.” In addition, Andrug Jindak received gifts of priceless religious relics including an earthen statue of God of Protection Jigchi Mahai and holy beads.

Later guerrilla operations 
From 1960, Chushi Gangdruk conducted its guerrilla operations from the northern Nepalese region of Mustang. In 1974, guerrilla operations ceased after the CIA, given the realignment of Sino-American relations initiated by President Richard Nixon, terminated its program of assistance to the Tibetan resistance movement and the Dalai Lama, the exiled Tibetan spiritual and temporal leader, taped a message telling the Tibetans to lay down their weapons and surrender peacefully.

See also 
 List of organizations of Tibetans in exile
 Tibetan American
 Tibetan Resistance Since 1950
 Special Frontier Force

References

Citations

Sources 
 

Tibet
1959 Tibetan uprising
Anti-communist organizations
Guerrilla organizations
Tibetan emigrants to India